The 2014 WNBA season is the 9th season for the Chicago Sky of the Women's National Basketball Association (WNBA). Coming off the franchise's first ever playoff appearance, the Sky looked to continue their success in the 2014 season.

The Sky's offseason included trading Swin Cash to Atlanta, signing free agent forward  Jessica Breland, center Sasha Goodlett, but also learning that center Sylvia Fowles would be missing some time due to Arthroscopic surgery of the hip to repair a torn Labrum and Impingement.

Although the Sky finished the season with a 15–19 record, they placed 4th in the Eastern Conference and qualified for the playoffs. They defeated the Atlanta Dream and Indiana Fever in the playoffs and made it to the 2014 WNBA Finals, but lost the series in three games.

Transactions

WNBA Draft

Trades and Roster Changes

Roster
{| class="toccolours" style="font-size: 95%; width: 100%;"
|-
! colspan="2"  style="background:#4b90cc; color:#Fbb726"|2014 Chicago Sky Roster
|- style="text-align:center; background-color:#Fbb726; color:#FFFFFF;"
! Players !! Coaches
|-
| valign="top" |
{| class="sortable" style="background:transparent; margin:0px; width:100%;"
! Pos. !! # !! Nat. !! Name !! Ht. !! Wt. !! From
|-

Depth

Schedule

Preseason

|- bgcolor="bbffbb"
| 1 || May 9 || Indiana || W 73-66 || Jamierra Faulkner (11) || Jessica Breland (7) || Jamierra Faulkner (5) || HP Field House || 1-0
|- style="background:#fcc;"
| 2 || May 11 || Minnesota || L 76-67 || Elena Delle Donne (15) || Gennifer Brandon (8) || Courtney Vandersloot (3)|| HP Field House3,194 || 1-1
|- bgcolor="bbffbb"
| 3 || May 13 || Washington || W 69-76 || Elena Delle Donne (17) || Jessica Breland (9) || Courtney Vandersloot (11) || Bob Carpenter Center || 2-1
|-

Regular Season

|- style="background:#cfc;"
| 1
| May 16
| Indiana
| W 74-71
| Elena Delle Donne (15)
| Sasha Goodlett (10)
| Courtney Vandersloot (5)
| Allstate Arena 6,721
| 1–0
|- style="background:#cfc;"
| 2
| May 17
| @ New York
| W 79-65
| Elena Delle Donne (23)
| Jessica Breland (11)
| Courtney Vandersloot (8)
| Madison Square Garden 9,131
| 2–0
|- style="background:#cfc;"
| 3
| May 21
| Connecticut
| W 78-68
| Elena Delle Donne (21)
| Jessica Breland (15)
| Courtney Vandersloot (7)
| Allstate Arena 4,951
| 3–0
|- style="background:#cfc;"
| 4
| May 23
| Atlanta
| W 87-73
| Elena Delle Donne (27)
| Jessica Breland (7)
| Courtney Vandersloot (11)
| Allstate Arena 4,136
| 4–0
|- style="background:#fcc;"
| 5
| May 25
| Minnesota
| L 72-75
| Delle DonneBreland (16)
| Jessica Breland (15)
| Courtney Vandersloot (10)
| Allstate Arena 6,058
| 4–1
|- style="background:#cfc;"
| 6
| May 30
| Connecticut
| W 101-82
| Elena Delle Donne (28)
| Jessica Breland (10)
| Courtney Vandersloot (13)
| Allstate Arena 5,693
| 5–1
|-

|- style="background:#fcc;"
| 7
| June 6
| Los Angeles
| L 88-102
| Elena Delle Donne (33)
| Elena Delle Donne (14)
| VanderslootFaulkner (4)
| Allstate Arena 6,681
| 5–2
|- style="background:#fcc;"
| 8
| June 7
| @ Atlanta
| L 59-97
| Allie Quigley (11)
| YoungBrandon (6)
| Courtney Vandersloot (7)
| Philips Arena 5,458
| 5–3
|- style="background:#fcc;"
| 9
| June 10
| Seattle
| L 76-80
| Epiphanny Prince (18)
| Markeisha Gatling (10)
| Epiphanny Prince (6)
| Allstate Arena 3,958
| 5–4
|- style="background:#fcc;"
| 10
| June 13
| @ Washington
| L 68-79
| Allie Quigley (18)
| Sasha Goodlett (8)
| Courtney Vandersloot (5)
| Verizon Center 7,198
| 5–5
|- style="background:#cfc;"
| 11
| June 18
| New York
| W 105-100 OT
| Epiphanny Prince (30)
| Tamera Young (12)
| Courtney Vandersloot (8)
| Allstate Arena 6,716
| 6–5
|- style="background:#fcc;"
| 12
| June 20
| Indiana
| L 75-83
| Epiphanny Prince (18)
| Tamera Young (9)
| VanderslootFaulkner (5)
| Allstate Arena 6,488
| 6–6
|- style="background:#fcc;"
| 13
| June 22
| Tulsa
| L 99-105 OT
| Jessica Breland (26)
| Jessica Breland (10)
| Epiphanny Prince (8)
| Allstate Arena 6,711
| 6–7
|- style="background:#fcc;"
| 14
| June 25
| @ Connecticut
| L 69-79
| Sylvia Fowles (17)
| Sylvia Fowles (9)
| Courtney Vandersloot (4)
| Mohegan Sun Arena 5,881
| 6–8
|- style="background:#cfc;"
| 15
| June 27
| @ New York
| W 73-69
| Epiphanny Prince (30)
| Tamera Young (5)
| Epiphanny Prince (5)
| Madison Square Garden 7,911
| 7–8
|-

|- style="background:#cfc;"
| 16
| July 1
| @ Los Angeles
| W 90-83
| Jamierra Faulkner (27)
| Jessica Breland (11)
| PrinceBrelandQuigley (4)
| Staples Center 7,201
| 8–8
|- style="background:#fcc;"
| 17
| July 2
| @ Phoenix
| L 69-87
| Allie Quigley (16)
| Sylvia Fowles (7)
| PrinceFaulkner (4)
| US Airways Center 7,845
| 8–9
|- style="background:#fcc;"
| 18
| July 5
| @ Seattle
| L 73-80
| Jessica Breland (20)
| Sylvia Fowles (11)
| Jamierra Faulkner (5)
| KeyArena 6,387
| 8–10
|- style="background:#fcc;"
| 19
| July 9
| Washington
| L 65-72
| Sylvia Fowles (19)
| Sylvia Fowles (17)
| Jamierra Faulkner (6)
| Allstate Arena 16,402
| 8–11
|- style="background:#fcc;"
| 20
| July 11
| Phoenix
| L 66-72
| Sylvia Fowles (23)
| Sylvia Fowles (11)
| Jamierra Faulkner (8)
| Allstate Arena 7,076
| 8–12
|- style="background:#fcc;"
| 21
| July 13
| @ Atlanta
| L 79-81 OT
| Allie Quigley (27)
| Sylvia Fowles (14)
| Jamierra Faulkner (8)
| McCamish Pavilion 4,118
| 8–13
|- style="background:#fcc;"
| 22
| July 17
| @ Indiana
| L 64-82
| Allie Quigley (17)
| Sylvia Fowles (11)
| Jessica Breland (3)
| Bankers Life Fieldhouse 8,333
| 8–14
|- style="background:#cfc;"
| 23
| July 22
| Indiana
| W 60-57
| Sylvia Fowles (21)
| Sylvia Fowles (10)
| Jamierra Faulkner (6)
| Allstate Arena 5,891
| 9–14
|- style="background:#cfc;"
| 24
| July 25
| @ Atlanta
| W 79-75
| Epiphanny Prince (21)
| Sylvia Fowles (12)
| Epiphanny Prince (7)
| McCamish Pavilion 4,544
| 10–14
|- style="background:#fcc;"
| 25
| July 27
| @ Tulsa
| L 69-79
| PrinceQuigley (14)
| FowlesBreland (9)
| PrinceFaulknerFowlesQuigley (3)
| BOK Center 5,540
| 10–15
|- style="background:#fcc;"
| 26
| July 29
| @ San Antonio
| L 74-92
| Epiphanny Prince (23)
| FowlesPrince (5)
| FaulknerBreland (4)
| AT&T Center 8,986
| 10–16
|- style="background:#cfc;"
| 27
| July 31
| New York
| W 87-74
| FowlesQuigley (16)
| Sylvia Fowles (14)
| FaulknerPrince (7)
| Allstate Arena 6,043
| 11–16
|-

|- style="background:#cfc;"
| 28
| August 3
| Washington
| W 76-65
| Elena Delle Donne (21)
| Sylvia Fowles (11)
| Epiphanny Prince (7)
| Allstate Arena 6,107
| 12–16
|- style="background:#cfc;"
| 29
| August 5
| @ Connecticut
| W 82-66
| Epiphanny Prince (20)
| Sylvia Fowles (12)
| Epiphanny Prince (6)
| Mohegan Sun Arena 5,343
| 13–16
|- style="background:#fcc;"
| 30
| August 7
| @ Minnesota
| L 64-74
| Allie Quigley (20)
| Jessica Breland (9)
| Jamierra Faulkner (6)
| Target Center 9,222
| 13–17
|- style="background:#cfc;"
| 31
| August 10
| Atlanta
| W 80-69
| Allie Quigley (17)
| Sylvia Fowles (15)
| Jamierra Faulkner (6)
| Allstate Arena 6,021
| 14–17
|- style="background:#cfc;"
| 32
| August 13
| @ Washington
| W 72-69
| Sylvia Fowles (21)
| Sylvia Fowles (16)
| Allie Quigley (6)
| Verizon Center 16,117
| 15–17
|- style="background:#fcc;"
| 33
| August 16
| @ Indiana
| L 67-71
| Allie Quigley (17)
| FowlesDelle Donne (7)
| Epiphanny Prince (4)
| Bankers Life Fieldhouse 10,625
| 15–18
|- style="background:#fcc;"
| 34
| August 17
| San Antonio
| L 72-84
| Courtney Clements (17)
| Gennifer Brandon (10)
| Courtney Vandersloot (4)
| Allstate Arena 7,987
| 15–19
|-

Playoffs

|- style="background:#cfc;"
| 1
| August 22
| @ Atlanta
| W 80-77
| Elena Delle Donne (21)
| Sylvia Fowles (14)
| VanderslootPrince (7)
| Philips Arena 5,985
| 1–0
|- style="background:#fcc;"
| 2
| August 24
| Atlanta
| L 83-92
| Elena Delle Donne (22)
| FowlesDelle Donne (6)
| Courtney Vandersloot (8)
| Allstate Arena 4,546
| 1–1
|- style="background:#cfc;"
| 3
| August 26
| @ Atlanta
| W 81-80
| Elena Delle Donne (34)
| Sylvia Fowles (15)
| VanderslootYoung (5)
| Philips Arena 4,829
| 2–1
|-

|- style="background:#fcc;"
| 1
| August 30
| @ Indiana
| L 70-77
| Sylvia Fowles (20)
| Sylvia Fowles (14)
| Courtney Vandersloot (4)
| Bankers Life Fieldhouse 7,557
| 0–1
|- style="background:#cfc;"
| 2
| September 1
| Indiana
| W 86-84
| Sylvia Fowles (27)
| Tamera Young (9)
| VanderslootPrinceQuigley (5)
| Allstate Arena 6,019
| 1–1
|- style="background:#cfc;"
| 3
| September 3
| @ Indiana
| W 75-62
| Allie Quigley (24)
| Sylvia Fowles (7)
| Courtney Vandersloot (9)
| Bankers Life Fieldhouse 7,705
| 2–1
|-

|- style="background:#fcc;"
| 1
| September 7
| @ Phoenix
| L 62-83
| Sylvia Fowles (19)
| Sylvia Fowles (11)
| Courtney Vandersloot (5)
| US Airways Center 13,263
| 0–1
|- style="background:#fcc;"
| 2
| September 7
| @ Phoenix
| L 68-97
| Elena Delle Donne (22)
| Sylvia Fowles (5)
| Courtney Vandersloot (4)
| US Airways Center 13,348
| 0–2
|- style="background:#fcc;"
| 3
| September 12
| Phoenix
| L 82-87
| Elena Delle Donne (23)
| Sylvia Fowles (8)
| Courtney Vandersloot (11)
| UIC Pavilion 7,365
| 0–3
|-

Standings

Playoffs

Statistics

Regular Season

Playoffs

Awards and Honors

References

External links

Chicago Sky seasons
Chicago
Eastern Conference (WNBA) championship seasons
2014 in sports in Illinois